Alessandro Circati (born 10 October 2003) is an Italian professional footballer who plays as a central defender for Serie B club Parma.

International career
Circati was born in Italy and moved to Australia at the age of 1, holding both nationalities. He was simultaneously called up to the Australia U23s and Italy U20s in March 2022. He opted to represent the Italy U20s, making a pair of friendly appearances.

Personal life
Alessandro is the son of former Italian football player Gianfranco Circati.

References

External links

FIGC U20 Profile

Living people
2003 births
Sportspeople from the Province of Parma
Footballers from Emilia-Romagna
People from Fidenza
Italian footballers
Italy youth international footballers
Australian soccer players
Italian emigrants to Australia
Australian people of Italian descent
Association football defenders
National Premier Leagues players
Serie B players
Perth Glory FC players
Parma Calcio 1913 players